Malkara loricata is a species of spiders in the family Malkaridae. It was first described in 1980 by Valerie Todd Davies. , it is the sole species in the genus Malkara. It is found in Queensland.

References

Malkaridae
Spiders of Australia
Spiders described in 1980
Taxa named by Valerie Todd Davies